Ali Suleiman Aujali (alternatively transliterated Ojli and Adjali) is a Libyan diplomat who formerly served successively as Libya's ambassador to Malaysia, Argentina, Brazil and the United States. He served as ambassador under the Gaddafi government, Libya's National Transitional Council, and Libya's General National Congress.  He declined the post of foreign minister under Prime minister Ali Zeidan in the government of the General National Congress.

Early life and education
Born in Benghazi in 1944, he received his BA in Business Administration from the Benghazi University.

Career

Aujali was first posted to the Libyan embassy in London as Third Secretary in 1971. In 1976 he was posted to the Libyan embassy in Kuala Lumpur, Malaysia, before being promoted in 1981 to the post of Ambassador to Malaysia. Subsequently, Aujali was the Libyan ambassador to Argentina (1984–1988) and then Brazil (1988–1994). As Ambassador to the United States from 2005 to 2011 for the Gaddafi government, he was also known for defending the return of Abdelbaset al-Megrahi to Libya. He also served as the chargé d'affaires to Canada (2001 to 2004).

Aujali was formerly Ambassador to the United States on behalf of the National Transitional Council from 15 August 2011 to 1 November 2012. He previously held the position on behalf of the Gaddafi government from January 2009 until February 2011, when he resigned in the wake of the Libyan Civil War. He joined the opposition National Transitional Council soon after; on 9 August the U.S. State Department confirmed that it had handed the Libyan embassy in Washington, D.C. to the NTC, and Aujali was re-accredited by the United States as Libya's Ambassador on 15 August 2011.

In the October 2012 meeting of the General National Congress (GNC), Aujali was chosen to continue to be Ambassador to the United States. and subsequently was nominated for minister of foreign affairs by Ali Zidan at the end of October 2012. Although cabinet minister are sworn in on 14 November 2013, he could not since his investigation by the commission regarding his ties to former ruler of Libya, Muammar Gaddafi, was not completed until that day. The commission cleared him on 27 November. However, he was not sworn in and resigned on 31 December 2012. He continued in 2013 to be Libya's ambassador to the U.S., being succeeded by Ms. Wafa Bughaighis in November 2017.

In 2018, Aujali joined the board of the National Council on US Libya Relations (NCULSR).

Press 

 No archive found.

References

External links

Living people
University of Benghazi alumni
Ambassadors of Libya to Argentina
Ambassadors of Libya to Brazil
Ambassadors of Libya to Malaysia
Ambassadors of Libya to the United States
People from Benghazi
1944 births